Thomas Sewell may refer to:
Tom Sewell (basketball) (born 1962), American shooting guard
Tom Sewell (cricketer, born 1806) (1806–1888), English cricketer
Tom Sewell (cricketer, born 1830) (1830–1871), English cricketer, son of Tom Sewell senior (above)
Tommy Sewell (1906–1956), baseball player
Thomas Sewell (Australian neo-Nazi) (born 1993), Australian nationalist
Thomas Sewell (judge) (c. 1710–1784), an English judge and MP.

See also
Thomas Sowell, American economist of the Chicago School